Herbert Henry Lee (27 March 1887 – 13 June 1980) was a British cyclist. He competed at the 1920 and the 1924 Summer Olympics.

References

External links
 

1887 births
1980 deaths
British male cyclists
Olympic cyclists of Great Britain
Cyclists at the 1920 Summer Olympics
Cyclists at the 1924 Summer Olympics
Place of birth missing